Mary Jackson (née Winston; April 9, 1921 – February 11, 2005) was an American mathematician and aerospace engineer at the National Advisory Committee for Aeronautics (NACA), which in 1958 was succeeded by the National Aeronautics and Space Administration (NASA). She worked at Langley Research Center in Hampton, Virginia, for most of her career. She started as a computer at the segregated West Area Computing division in 1951. She took advanced engineering classes and, in 1958, became NASA's first black female engineer.

After 34 years at NASA, Jackson had earned the most senior engineering title available. She realized she could not earn further promotions without becoming a supervisor. She accepted a demotion to become a manager of both the Federal Women's Program, in the NASA Office of Equal Opportunity Programs and of the Affirmative Action Program. In this role, she worked to influence the hiring and promotion of women in NASA's science, engineering, and mathematics careers.

Jackson's story features in the 2016 non-fiction book Hidden Figures: The American Dream and the Untold Story of the Black Women Who Helped Win the Space Race. She is one of the three protagonists in Hidden Figures, the film adaptation released the same year.

In 2019, Jackson was posthumously awarded the Congressional Gold Medal. In 2021, the Washington, D.C. headquarters of NASA was renamed the Mary W. Jackson NASA Headquarters.

Personal life 

Mary Winston was born on April 9, 1921, to Ella Winston (née Scott) and Frank Winston. She grew up in Hampton, Virginia, where she graduated from high school with highest honors.

Mary Jackson earned bachelor's degrees in mathematics and physical science from Hampton University in 1942. She was a member of the Alpha Kappa Alpha.

Jackson served for more than 30 years as a Girl Scout leader. In the 1970s she helped African American children in her community create a miniature wind tunnel for testing airplanes.

Jackson was married on November 18, 1944 to Levi Jackson Sr., a sailor in the U.S. Navy, until his death in 1992. They had two children, Levi Jackson Jr. and Carolyn Marie Lewis. She died on February 11, 2005, age 83.

Career 

After graduation, Mary Jackson taught mathematics for a year at an African-American school in Calvert County, Maryland. At that time, public schools were still segregated across the South. She also began tutoring high school and college students, which she continued to do throughout her life.

By 1943, she had returned to Hampton, where she became a bookkeeper at the National Catholic Community Center there. She worked as a receptionist and clerk at the Hampton Institute's Health Department. She was pregnant during this time and eventually returned home for the birth of her son. In 1951, she became a clerk at the Office of the Chief Army Field Forces at Fort Monroe.

In 1951, Jackson was recruited by the National Advisory Committee for Aeronautics (NACA), which in 1958 was succeeded by the National Aeronautics and Space Administration (NASA). She started as a research mathematician, or computer, at the Langley Research Center in her hometown of Hampton, Virginia. She worked under Dorothy Vaughan in the segregated West Area Computing Section.

In 1953, she accepted an offer to work for engineer Kazimierz Czarnecki in the Supersonic Pressure Tunnel. The ,  wind tunnel was used to study forces on a model by generating winds at almost twice the speed of sound. Czarnecki encouraged Jackson to undergo training so that she could be promoted to an engineer. She needed to take graduate-level courses in mathematics and physics to qualify for the job. They were offered in a night program by the University of Virginia, held at the all-white Hampton High School. Jackson petitioned the City of Hampton to allow her to attend the classes. After completing the courses, she was promoted to aerospace engineer in 1958, and became NASA's first black female engineer. She analyzed data from wind tunnel experiments and real-world aircraft flight experiments at the Theoretical Aerodynamics Branch of the Subsonic-Transonic Aerodynamics Division at Langley. Her goal was to understand air flow, including thrust and drag forces, in order to improve United States planes.

Jackson worked as an engineer in several NASA divisions: the Compressibility Research Division, Full-Scale Research Division, High-Speed Aerodynamics Division, and the Subsonic-Transonic Aerodynamics Division. She ultimately authored or co-authored 12 technical papers for NACA and NASA. She worked to help women and other minorities to advance their careers, including advising them how to study in order to qualify for promotions.

By 1979, Jackson had achieved the most senior title within the engineering department. She decided to take a demotion in order to serve as an administrator in the Equal Opportunity Specialist field. After undergoing training at NASA Headquarters, she returned to Langley. She worked to make changes and highlight women and other minorities who were accomplished in the field. She served as both the Federal Women's Program Manager in the Office of Equal Opportunity Programs and as the Affirmative Action Program Manager, and she worked to influence the career paths of women in science, engineering, and mathematics positions at NASA. She continued to work at NASA until her retirement in 1985.

Legacy 
The 2016 film Hidden Figures recounts the NASA careers of Jackson, Katherine Johnson, and Dorothy Vaughan working on Project Mercury during the Space Race. The film is based on the book of the same name by Margot Lee Shetterly. Jackson is portrayed in the film by Janelle Monáe.

In 2018, the Salt Lake City School Board voted that Jackson Elementary School in Salt Lake City, Utah, would be renamed for Mary Jackson instead of President Andrew Jackson.

NASA's headquarters building in Washington, D.C. was renamed the Mary W. Jackson NASA Headquarters in a virtual ceremony on February 26, 2021.

Awards, achievements and honours 
 In 1958, Mary Jackson became the first Female African-American to become an engineer 
 Apollo Group Achievement Award, 1969
 Daniels Alumni Award for Outstanding Service to Disadvantaged Youth
 National Council of Negro Women, Inc. Certificate of Recognition for Outstanding Service to the Community
 In 1972, Distinguished Service Award for her work with the Combined Federal Campaign representing Humanitarian Agencies 
 Langley Research Center Outstanding Volunteer Award, 1975
 Langley Research Center Volunteer of the Year, 1976
 Iota Lambda Sorority Award for the Peninsula Outstanding Woman Scientist, 1976
 King Street Community Center Outstanding Award
 National Technical Association's Tribute Award, 1976
 Hampton Roads Chapter "Book of Golden Deeds" for service
 Langley Research Center Certificate of Appreciation, 1976–1977
Congressional Gold Medal, 2019
 On November 6, 2020, a satellite (ÑuSat 17 or "Mary", COSPAR 2020-079J) named after her was launched into space

Publications

References

External links

1921 births
2005 deaths
20th-century African-American women
20th-century African-American people
20th-century American engineers
20th-century American mathematicians
20th-century women engineers
20th-century women mathematicians
African-American academics
African-American engineers
African-American mathematicians
African-American scientists
African-American women academics
American women academics
African-American women engineers
American aerospace engineers
American women engineers
American women scientists
Congressional Gold Medal recipients
Engineers from Virginia
Hampton University alumni
Langley Research Center
Mathematicians from Virginia
NASA people
People from Hampton, Virginia
West Area Computers